Sir Henry Merrivale is a fictional amateur detective created by "Carter Dickson", a pen name of John Dickson Carr (1906–1977). Also known as "the Old Man," by his initials "H. M." (a pun on "His Majesty"), or "the Maestro", Merrivale appears in 22 of Carr's locked-room mysteries and "impossible crime" novels of the 1930s, 1940s, and 1950s, as well as in two short stories.

Character
Merrivale is a fairly serious character in the early novels but is more of a comic figure in the later books, sometimes bordering on the grotesque. Much of the humor surrounding the character derives from his outbursts of temper and his absurdly colourful language.

When first introduced as a character, he is described as an older man nearing retirement. In later works, he talks explicitly about his age. In the 1940 novel "And So to Murder", set in late 1939, Merrivale refers to himself as being almost 70. In the 1941 novel "Seeing is Believing", while dictating his memoirs, he even gives his date of birth, February 6, 1871, which is consistent with his earlier comment. But his age becomes more ambiguous in subsequent novels. In the final books in the series, when he theoretically would be in his 80s, there's no indication that he has been slowed by the years.

He is a baronet and a barrister – in The Judas Window he actually appears for the defence in court in a murder case – and he holds a medical degree. He has a number of other talents, including stage magic, disguise and a vast knowledge of the history of crime.

Merrivale occasionally mentions his family — a wife, two daughters and (late in the series) two sons-in-law. With his characteristically comic gruffness, he is inclined to complain about the trouble these relations give him, but none of them appear in any of the books or stories.

In other media
And So to Murder and The Judas Window were adapted for the BBC anthology series Detective. Merrivale was played by Martin Wyldeck and David Horne respectively.

He Wouldn't Kill Patience was adapted for the BBC Home Service  in 1959, with Felix Felton portraying Sir Henry.

In Anthony Shaffer's play Sleuth, mystery writer Andrew Wyke's most famous character is an aristocratic detective named St. John, Lord Merridew. This character was inspired by Sir Henry Merrivale, and the character of Wyke was inspired by Carr.

References

External links
 Appraisal of all the HM books
 John Dickson Carr at Books and Writers

Literary characters introduced in 1934
Fictional amateur detectives
Novel series